Paul Anthony Sorrento (born November 17, 1965) is an American former first baseman in Major League Baseball, who currently serves as the assistant hitting coach for the Los Angeles Angels. 

From 1989 through 1999, Sorrento played for the Minnesota Twins (1989–1991), Cleveland Indians (1992–1995), Seattle Mariners (1996–1997) and Tampa Bay Devil Rays (1998–1999). He batted left-handed and threw right-handed.

Amateur career
Sorrento played high school baseball for St. John's Preparatory School in Danvers, Massachusetts (1979–1983). Sorrento played college baseball for the Florida State University Seminoles under head coach Mike Martin. In 1985, he played collegiate summer baseball with the Harwich Mariners of the Cape Cod Baseball League.

Professional career
In an 11-season career, Sorrento posted a .257 batting average with 166 home runs and 565 RBI in 1093 games played. In 11 playoff game appearances with the Minnesota Twins, Cleveland Indians and Seattle Mariners, he had a .213 batting average with 1 home run and 2 RBIs in 47 at-bats.

Sorrento played in two World Series, one for the Twins in 1991 and one for the Indians, in 1995. On April 6, 1992, Sorrento recorded the first hit during the regular season at Oriole Park at Camden Yards.

Coaching career
On January 13, 2012, Sorrento was named hitting coach for Inland Empire 66ers of the California League; a Class A-Advanced affiliate of the Los Angeles Angels of Anaheim. On November 9, 2012, he was named the minor league hitting coordinator for the Los Angeles Angels of Anaheim organization. On November 3, 2015, Sorrento was hired as the Angels assistant hitting coach.

See also

List of athletes on Wheaties boxes

References

External links

1965 births
Living people
American people of Italian descent
Baseball coaches from Massachusetts
Baseball players from Massachusetts
Cleveland Indians players
Florida State Seminoles baseball players
Florida State University alumni
Inland Empire 66ers coaches
Los Angeles Angels coaches
Los Angeles Angels of Anaheim coaches
Major League Baseball designated hitters
Major League Baseball first basemen
Major League Baseball hitting coaches
Minnesota Twins players
Orlando Twins players
Palm Springs Angels players
People from Peabody, Massachusetts
Portland Beavers players
Quad Cities Angels players
Sacramento River Cats players
Seattle Mariners players
Sportspeople from Essex County, Massachusetts
Sportspeople from Somerville, Massachusetts
Tampa Bay Devil Rays players
Harwich Mariners players